The Henry County Sheriff's Office (HCSO) is the primary law enforcement agency servicing 54,151 people within  of jurisdiction within Henry County, Virginia.

During the American Revolution, when Henry County was formed in 1777, Robert Hairston was appointed the first "High sheriff" by Governor Thomas Nelson Jr. Alexander Hunter also served as sheriff of Henry County for one year in 1803.

Organization
The agency is currently headed by Sheriff Lane Perry. The HCSO currently has 122 employees and 85 fleet vehicles.

The HCSO has four divisions:

Administrative Operations They provide: Community Oriented Policing (COPS), School Resources Officers (SRO), Animal Control/Animal Shelter, Electronic Incarceration Program, Criminal Records Management, Civil Process, Purchasing, and Maintenance.
The Patrol Division They respond to initial calls for services, investigates criminal offenses and enforces traffic violations.
The Investigations Division To investigate larcenies, burglaries and homicides.
The Corrections Division To provide security at the County jail facility and courthouse, and the transportation of inmates.

The HCSO has the fallowing special programs:

Electronic Incarceration Program  A computerized incarceration-monitoring program.
Inmate Work Force Program It allows non-violent prisoners to clean up trash and debris along roadways throughout Henry County while under the supervision of a Deputy Sheriff.
School Resource Program To provide a safe learning environment where the officers act as counselors, peacekeepers and role models in the school system.
Neighborhood Watch Program It unites with the citizens of Henry County to prevent crime in the communities.
Senior and Teen (COP) Police Academy Programs An 8 week course to teach citizens law enforcement training and procedures.

United States v. Frank Cassell
On November 2, 2006, a federal Grand Jury charged 20 employees of the Sheriff's Office for their roles in a racketeering conspiracy that included the distribution of illegal drugs, theft of drugs and firearms under the custody of the Henry County Sheriff’s Office, money laundering, and obstruction of justice. Thirteen of the twenty defendants were current or former employees of the Henry County, Virginia Sheriff’s Office.  Eighteen of the defendants, including the sheriff, were convicted of felony offenses, and two were placed on pre-trial diversion.

According to the indictment, since 1998, sworn officers, employees, and associates of the Henry County Sheriff’s Office engaged in a continuous scheme to steal narcotics, firearms, and other contraband from the seized evidence property room.  The defendants took cocaine, crack cocaine, marijuana, and firearms, and then sold the stolen drugs and guns back into the community.  The Grand Jury also has alleged that several of the defendants stole seized firearms and other contraband for their own personal use.	
	
Sheriff Frank Cassell was convicted of making false statements to agents of the FBI.  Specifically, Sheriff Cassell had been told of various illegal activities involving Henry County Sheriff’s Deputies including the distribution of two kilograms of cocaine, embezzlement, and the use of steroids by several high-ranking members of the Henry County Sheriff’s Office. Cassell covered up these illegal activities in several ways; by not pursuing investigations and by agreeing to pass on any law enforcement information to the offending parties so they could avoid apprehension, by making false statements to federal investigators and by attempting to aid former Sergeant James Alden Vaught in a money laundering scheme to disguise the source of money represented to have been derived from the distribution of cocaine. Specifically, Cassell acknowledged that he attempted to help Vaught give $10,000 of known drug proceeds the appearance of legitimacy by cosigning for a loan for Vaught. Cassell then counseled Vaught to deposit small amounts of cash into a checking account to pay off the loan. In addition, Cassell agreed with Vaught never to mention the existence of the money derived from illegal drug distribution and then lied to investigators, saying he knew nothing about Vaught’s illegal drug activities.

See also

 List of law enforcement agencies in Virginia

References

External links
Henry County Sheriff's Office official weblink
Henry County government official website

Sheriff's Office
County sheriffs' offices of Virginia